Federal Highway 62 (Carretera Federal 62) (Fed. 62) is a free (libre) part of the federal highways corridors (los corredores carreteros federales) of Mexico. The highway travels from San Tiburcio, Zacatecas to Matehuala, San Luis Potosí.

References

062
Transportation in San Luis Potosí
Transportation in Zacatecas